The Cambridge Journal of Economics is a peer-reviewed academic journal of economics. The journal was founded in 1977 by the Cambridge Political Economy Society with the aim of publishing articles that followed the economic traditions established by Karl Marx, J. M. Keynes, Michał Kalecki, Joan Robinson, and Nicholas Kaldor. Luigi Pasinetti has noted the "strong ties" between the Cambridge Journal of Economics and the Cambridge School of Keynesian Economics.

Abstracting and indexing 
The journal is abstracted and indexed in the Social Sciences Citation Index. According to the Journal Citation Reports, the journal has a 2020 impact factor of 2.156.

See also 
 List of economics journals

References

External links 
 
 Cambridge Political Economy Society

Bimonthly journals
Economics journals
English-language journals
Oxford University Press academic journals
Publications established in 1977